The 2018–19 Jacksonville State Gamecocks men's basketball team represented Jacksonville State University during the 2018–19 NCAA Division I men's basketball season. The Gamecocks, led by third-year head coach Ray Harper, played their home games at the Pete Mathews Coliseum in Jacksonville, Alabama as members of the  Ohio Valley Conference. They finished the season 24–9, 15–3 in OVC play to finish in third place. They defeated UT Martin in the quarterfinals of the OVC tournament before losing in the semifinals to Murray State. Despite having 24 wins, they did not participate in a postseason tournament.

Previous season 
The Gamecocks finished the 2017–18 season 23–13, 11–7 in OVC play to finish in fourth place. They defeated Tennessee Tech in the quarterfinals of the OVC tournament before losing in the semifinals to Murray State. They were invited to the College Basketball Invitational where they defeated Canisius and Central Arkansas to advance to the semifinals where they lost to North Texas.

Roster

Schedule and results

|-
!colspan=9 style=| Non-conference regular season

|-
!colspan=9 style=| Ohio Valley Conference regular season

|-
!colspan=9 style=| Ohio Valley Conference tournament

References

Jacksonville State Gamecocks men's basketball seasons
Jacksonville State
Jacksonville State
Jacksonville State